WWE One Night Stand was a professional wrestling pay-per-view (PPV) event, produced every June by World Wrestling Entertainment (WWE), a professional wrestling promotion based in Connecticut. The event was created in 2005 and its name refers to its original format, that being a one-night reunion show for Extreme Championship Wrestling alumni. The first two shows were promoted under the ECW acronym; this, however, was changed for the 2007 and 2008 events. As WWE launched their own version of ECW in 2006 as a third brand alongside Raw and SmackDown, these two shows were promoted under the WWE acronym. The final event under the One Night Stand name was in 2008 before being renamed Extreme Rules in 2009. The 2009 Extreme Rules was noted by WWE to be a direct continuation of the One Night Stand chronology; however, the 2010 event was later promoted as only the second event under a new Extreme Rules chronology, one that is no longer a direct continuation of the One Night Stand event. Extreme Rules, however, continued the theme of featuring various hardcore-based matches.

History
In 2001, the Extreme Championship Wrestling (ECW) promotion was closed down due to financial issues and World Wrestling Entertainment (WWE) acquired the former promotion's assets in 2003. With the success of The Rise and Fall of ECW (2004) documentary, WWE announced that they would be holding an ECW reunion show on June 12, 2005, at the Hammerstein Ballroom in the Manhattan borough of New York, New York titled ECW One Night Stand. Although the build-up for the pay-per-view began in the middle of May, plans were in the works behind the scenes for several months in advance. Tommy Dreamer was in charge of organizing the hardcore-based event and getting ECW alumni to participate, which were referred to as ECW Originals in the build to the show. He contacted several people, including The Sandman, Sabu, Justin Credible, and ECW commentator Joey Styles. Reports later stated that Paul Heyman was working with Dreamer to help prepare the event. Other ECW related wrestlers were later added to the pay-per-view. The event was publicly confirmed by WWE through a Dish Network magazine in March 2005. In an interview with SLAM! Sports days before One Night Stand, ECW original Rob Van Dam announced he had asked Vince McMahon about the idea of holding an ECW reunion event. Although held as a reunion show for ECW alumni, wrestlers from WWE's Raw and SmackDown brands also took part in the event.

WWE adopted One Night Stand as an annual June pay-per-view event and continued the theme of featuring hardcore-based matches on the show. The event returned to the Hammerstein Ballroom for ECW One Night Stand 2006. Just prior to this 2006 event, WWE established a third brand dubbed ECW for former wrestlers of the original promotion, as well as newer talent, to compete on. One Night Stand would continue for another two years (dropping the "ECW" name in 2007 and just being promoted as WWE), until it was replaced by Extreme Rules in 2009. One Night Stand was originally just renamed Extreme Rules for 2009, but in 2010, WWE declared that Extreme Rules was its own chronology, one that was no longer part of the One Night Stand chronology. Extreme Rules, however, continued the hardcore-based theme.

Events

See also
 Extreme Championship Wrestling
 List of WWE pay-per-view events
 WWE Extreme Rules

References

External links
Official One Night Stand website

 
Recurring events established in 2005
Recurring events disestablished in 2008